The Medium (German:Das Medium) is a 1921 German silent film directed by Hermann Rosenfeld and starring Lil Dagover.

The film's art direction was by Artur Günther.

Cast
In alphabetical order
 Karl Armster 
 Harry Berber
 Erra Bognar 
 Lil Dagover 
 Fred Goebel
 Bruno Harprecht 
 Edgar Klitzsch 
 Werner Krauss 
 Frieda Lehndorf 
 Frida Richard

References

Bibliography
 Hans-Michael Bock and Tim Bergfelder. The Concise Cinegraph: An Encyclopedia of German Cinema. Berghahn Books.

External links

1921 films
Films of the Weimar Republic
German silent feature films
Films produced by Erich Pommer
German black-and-white films